Sivrihisar Grand Mosque is a historical mosque in Sivrihisar, Turkey.

The mosque is located in Sivrihisar ilçe (district) of Eskişehir Province. It was built by Leşker Emir Celaleddin Ali in 1231–1232 during the reign of Anatolian Seljuk Sultan Kayqubad I (r. 1220–1237). It saw later two restorations, in 1275 by Eminüddin Mikail bin Abdullah, the regent of Kaykhusraw III (r. 1265–1284), and in 1440 by Hızır Bey, a judge in Sivrihisar and later the first judge in Istanbul. The mosque is a rare example of wooden-columned architectural technique in Anatolia together with four others.

It has a rectangular plan. The outer walls are of ashlar. It has four entrances. Marble inscriptions showing the historical restoration dates are found on the northern and eastern gates. The roof is covered by tiles, which were replaced by lead sheet not long ago. The roof is carried by 67 wooden columns in the inside, of which upper parts are decorated by painted mostly in green, red and black colors engravings of traditional figures. Some columns stand on stone base having ancient column head. It is likely that the stone columns heads originate from Pessinus, an ancient city known as Ballıhisar today close to Sivrihisar. There are six naves in east-west direction. The middle naves are higher than the others resembling the historic Turkic tents used in the nomadic era the Central Asia. The mosque's minbar, the pulpit, is a masterwork made by Horasanlı İbni Mehmet in 1245, and is famous for its ornaments in geometrical and floral design engraved in walnut wood. It is believed that the minbar was brought here from the Sivrihisar Kılıç Masjid, which was demolished in 1924. The minaret was added by Osman oğlu Hacı Habib in 1409–1410 according to its inscription.

World Heritage Site status
This site was added to the UNESCO World Heritage Tentative List on April 13, 2016 in the Cultural category.

Gallery

References

Mosques in Eskişehir
Sultanate of Rum
Seljuk mosques in Turkey
World Heritage Tentative List for Turkey
Sivrihisar District
Sivrihisar
Mosques completed in 1232